A list of museums in Jamaica.

Bank of Jamaica Currency Museum
Bob Marley Mausoleum
Bob Marley Museum
Bustamante Museum
Cecil Charlton Park
Firefly Estate
Fort Charles Museum
Fort Charlotte
Fort George
Fort Haldane
Jamaica Music Museum
Hanover Museum
Liberty Hall: The Legacy of Marcus Garvey
[Michael Manley Foundation]
Military Museum
Museum of St. James
National Gallery of Jamaica
Natural History Museum of Jamaica
Peoples’ Museum of Craft and Technology
Peter Tosh Museum
Sir Noël Coward Museum
Taino Museum of the First Jamaicans
Trench Town Culture Yard

 

Jamaica
Museums

Jamaica
Museums
Museums